Andy Winter is a Norwegian keyboardist that is a founding member of the Norwegian bands Winds and Age of Silence and is part of the American bands Sculptured and formerly Subterranean Masquerade.

Andy Winter has a yet-unnamed musical project in the works, of which drummer and bandmate in Winds and Age of Silence Jan Axel Blomberg recorded for in 2007.

Discography

With Winds
Of Entity and Mind (EP, 2001)
Reflections of the I (full-length, 2002)
The Imaginary Direction of Time (full-length, 2004)
Prominence and Demise (full-length, 2007)

With Age of Silence
Acceleration (full-length, 2004)
Complications - Trilogy of Intricacy (EP, 2005)

With Sculptured
Embodiment: Collapsing Under the Weight of God (full-length, 2008)

With Subterranean Masquerade
Temporary Psychotic State (EP, 2004)

Solo
Shades of Light Through Black and White (EP, 2005)
Incomprehensible (full-length, 2013)

References

Year of birth missing (living people)
Living people
Norwegian keyboardists
Heavy metal keyboardists
Winds (band) members